David Thomas Meiring (born 23 April 1986) is a former New Zealand cricketer who played first-class and List A cricket for Central Districts in 2014 and 2015. He is now a cricket coach.

Meiring was a batsman. As well as playing for Central Districts, he played Hawke Cup cricket for Manawatu from 2009-10 to 2016-17, which included two periods when Manawatu held the trophy. He also coached the team. He retired after the 2018-19 season, having scored 3919 runs in 88 matches for Manawatu. In September 2019 he was appointed a pathways coach for Central Districts and regularly acted as head coach for Central Districts A. He is the grandson of the New Zealand cricketer Tom Pritchard, who played for Manawatu in the 1930s.

References

External links
 
 David Meiring at CricketArchive

1986 births
Living people
New Zealand cricketers
Central Districts cricketers
Sportspeople from Worcester, England
New Zealand cricket coaches